St. Peregrine (Latin: Peregrinus) the martyr was an early Christian martyr who died because he and others refused to worship the Roman Emperor Commodus on his birthday.

External links
 Biography and legend
 Finding Minnesota: Saint's Buried In Collegeville

References

182 deaths
2nd-century Christian martyrs
Year of birth unknown